The Group of African States, or African Group, is one of the five United Nations regional groups and is composed of 54 Member States from the African continent. The African Group is the largest regional group, and compose 28% of all United Nations members.

The Group, as with all the regional groups, is a non-binding dialogue group where subjects concerning regional and international matters are discussed. Additionally, the Group works to help allocates seats on United Nations bodies by nominating candidates from the region.

Role 
The Group, as with all the regional groups, plays a major role in promoting the region's interests. It provides a forum for Member States to exchange opinions on international issues, carry out follow-up on the topics that are being discussed in international organisations, build common positions on complex issues and prepare statements reflecting the joint position of the Group.

However, most importantly, the Group allows for the discussion and coordination of support for candidates for different United Nations organisations from the region.

Member States 
The following are the Member States of the African Group:

Representation

Security Council 
The African Group currently holds three seats on the Security Council, all non-permanent. The current members of the Security Council from the Group are:

Economic and Social Council 
The African Group currently holds 14 seats on the United Nations Economic and Social Council. The current members of the Economic and Social Council from the Group are:

Human Rights Council 
The African Group currently holds 13 seats on the United Nations Human Rights Council. The current members of the Human Rights Council from the Group are:

Presidency of the General Assembly 
Every five years in the years ending in 4 and 9, the African Group is eligible to elect a president to the General Assembly.

The following is a list of presidents from the Group since its official creation in 1963:

References 

United Nations coalitions and unofficial groups